Alfred Baldwin Sloane (28 August 1872, Baltimore – 21 February 1925, Red Bank, New Jersey) was an American composer, considered the most prolific songwriter for Broadway musical comedies at the beginning of the 20th century.

His scores were first heard in amateur productions in Baltimore, where he grew up.  When Sloane first moved to New York in 1890, he began interpolating melodies into others' scores and soon was invited to create his own. His biggest hit was "Heaven Will Protect the Working Girl," which Marie Dressler introduced in Tillie's Nightmare (1910), but none of his songs found enduring popularity.

He composed only rarely after 1912, but he did provide much of the music for the 1919 and 1920 Greenwich Village Follies.  He wrote one of his musicals, Lady Teazle, for Lillian Russell when she was at the height of her national popularity.  His last score, for the 1925 Broadway production China Rose, was in production at his death.  China Rose had been produced in Boston, by Christmas Eve, 1924.

Early life 
Sloane, who at the age of 18, moved from Baltimore to New York City in 1890 intending to stay a month, stayed for the rest of his life.  While living in Baltimore, Sloane wrote the lyrics and music for about a dozen so-called coon songs.

As a boy in Baltimore, Sloane was an apprentice at a wholesale dry goods dealer.  His father, a scientist and dilettante musician, became alarmed at the thought of him trying to make a living as a composer.  However, Sloane spent most or his time in the dry goods house composing songs on the backs of pearl button cards, shirt boxes, and price tickets.  Sloane was fired from the dry goods house for wasting time making rhymes.  While his father was trying to find another job for him, he organized an amateur company in Baltimore which put on a musical comedy of one of his compositions and drew $25,000 in five nights.  Sloane showed his father the box office reports and opposition ceased.  It was soon after that the boy quit Baltimore and approached New York with misgivings as to his own ability to offer one of his shows to Oscar Hammerstein.  Hammerstein produced the show and Sloane never left New York.

Executive positions 
 At the time of his death, Sloane was the president of Composers' Publishing Company and vice president of Authors and Composers Publishing Company.

Affiliations 
He was a member of The Lambs, the Green Room Club, and Old Strollers.

Selected musical scores 
New York productions

 Peggy-Ann December 27, 1926 – October 29, 1927, Vanderbilt Theatre (333 performances)   
 China Rose, music by Sloane, January 19, 1925 – May 9, 1925
 The Greenwich Village Follies of 1920, music by Sloane, August 30, 1920 – March 5, 1921
 The Greenwich Village Follies (1919), music by Sloane, July 15, 1919 – January 31, 1920
 Ladies First, Nora Bayes production, adaptation from Charles H. Hoyt's A Contented Woman, by Harry B. Smith, music by Sloane, October 24, 1918 – March 15, 1919
 Marie Dressler's All Star Gambol, music by Sloane, March 10, 1913 – March 15, 1913
 The Sun Dodgers, music by Sloane, November 30, 1912 – December 14, 1912
 Roly Poly / Without the Law (burlesque), music & lyrics by Sloane, November 21, 1912 – Jan 11, 1913
 Hanky Panky, music by Sloane, August 5, 1912 – November 2, 1912
 Alexander's Bag-Pipe Band, lyrics & music by E. Ray Goetz, Irving Berlin, and A. Baldwin (1912)
 Hokey-Pokey / Bunty Pulls the Strings, music by Sloane, February 8, 1912 – May 11, 1912
 The Never Homes, music by Sloane, October 5, 1911 – Dec 23, 1911
 Hello, Paris, featuring songs by Sloane, August 19, 1911 – September 30, 1911
 The Hen-Pecks, music by Sloane, February 4, 1911 – September 23, 1911
  The Summer Widowers, music by Sloane, June 4, 1910 – October 1, 1910
 Tillie's Nightmare, music by Sloane, May 5, 1910 – Dec 1911
 The Prince of Bohemia, music by Sloane, January 14, 1910 – Feb 1910
 Lo (musical comedy), book & lyrics by O. Henry (pseudonym of William Sydney Porter) & Franklin Pierce Adams, music by Sloane (1909)
 Fascinating Flora, featuring songs by Sloane, May 20, 1907 – September 7, 1907
 The Mimic and the Maid, music by Sloane, January 11, 1907 – Jan 12, 1907
 The Great Decide, music by Sloane, November 15, 1906 – Dec 29, 1906
 About Town, additional music by Sloane, November 15, 1906 – Dec 29, 1906
 Seeing New York, book by Sloane, June 5, 1906 – August 18, 1906
 Coming Thro' The Rye, music by Sloane, January 9, 1906 – February 10, 1906
 The Gingerbread Man, music by Sloane, December 25, 1905 – May 26, 1906

 Lady Teazle, music by Sloane, December 24, 1904 – February 11, 1905
 The Wizard of Oz, music by Sloane, March 21, 1904 – Nov 25, 1905
 Glittering Gloria, featuring songs by Sloane, February 15, 1904 – April 1904
 Sergeant Kitty, music Sloane, January 18, 1904 – March 12, 1904
 The Girl from Dixie, additional music by Sloane, December 14, 1903 – January 2, 1904
 Red Feather, additional lyrics and music by Sloane, November 9, 1903 – April 1904
 George W. Lederer's Mid-Summer Night Fancies, additional music Sloane, June 22, 1903 – July 18, 1903
 The Wizard of Oz, music by Sloane, January 20, 1903 – Oct 3, 1903
 The Mocking Bird, music by Sloane, November 10, 1902 – Jun 8, 1903
 The Belle of Broadway, music by Sloane, March 15, 1902 – March 29, 1902
 The Hall of Fame, music by Sloane, February 5, 1902 – June 4, 1902
 The Supper Club, music by Sloane, lyrics by Sloane, December 23, 1901 – January 25, 1902
 The Little Duchess, additional music by Sloane, October 14, 1901 – April 1902
 The Liberty Belles, additional music by Sloane, September 30, 1901 – January 1902
 The King's Carnival, music by Sloane, September 9, 1901 – October 12, 1901
 The King's Carnival, music by Sloane, May 13, 1901 – June 6, 1901
 The Giddy Throng, music by Sloane, December 24, 1900 – May 11, 1901
 Madge Smith, Attorney, music by Sloane, December 10, 1900 – March 1901
 Nell-Go-In, music by Sloane, October 31, 1900 – November 17, 1900
 A Million Dollars, music by Sloane, September 27, 1900 – October 20, 1900
 Aunt Hannah, music by Sloane, February 22, 1900 – Mar 10, 1900
 Broadway to Tokio, music by Sloane, January 23, 1900 – April 7, 1900
 Papa's Wife, additional music by Sloane, November 13, 1899 – March 31, 1900
 The Queen's Fan, music by Sloane, lyrics by George Totten Smith, opened March 11, 1899, Frederick P. Proctor's 23rd Street Theatre
 Jack and the Beanstalk (musical extravaganza), music by Sloane, November 1896
 Excelsior, Jr., music by Sloane, November 25, 1895

New York productions (dates not known)

 Mustapha

Baltimore

 Midas (operetta), Albaugh's Lyceum Theatre (show was purchased by Edward E. Rice), February 9, 1895  
 Li'l Mose, music by Sloane, April 28, 1908 —
 Mustapha, music & lyrics by Sloane, Pain and Powder Club, performed at Albaugh's theater, 1894

Filmography 
Soundtrack
 1952: Somebody Loves Me, Toddling the Todalo lyrics by Sloane
 1940: Strike Up the Band, Heaven Will Protect the Working Girl, music & lyrics by Sloane (uncredited)
 1939: Frontier Marshal Heaven Will Protect the Working Girl, music & lyrics by Sloan (uncredited)
Writer
 1914: Tillie's Punctured Romance, Tillie's Nightmare (uncredited)
Self 
 1914: Our Mutual Girl, Sloane plays himself (episode 10)

Selected sheet music 
William Pilling, New York (publisher)
  He Cert'ny Was Good To Me, lyrics by Jean C. Havez, music by Sloane (1898)

M. Witmark & Sons
 Susie, Mah Sue, music & lyrics by Sloane (lyricist) (1900) – from the musical Broadway to Tokio
 Lazy Bill, A Volunteer Of Rest, music by Sloane, lyrics by Glen MacDonough (1897) - from the musical The Marquis of Michigan

Joseph W. Stern & Co., New York
 There's a Little Street in Heaven That They Call Broadway, lyrics by James T. Waldron & Sloane, music by Sloane (1903) 

Charles K. Harris, Chicago
 The Gingerbread Man (musical)
 Book & lyrics by Frederic Ranken, music by Sloane (1905)
 The Evil Eye
 The Beautiful Land of Bon Bon
 John Dough
 Moon Song

Family 
Sloane was the son of Francis James Sloane and Emma Baldwin (maiden).  He married Lucille Mae Auwerda in Manhattan on February 15, 1900.  They had one daughter – June Augusta Sloane (1901–1984) – who married Isaac Hosford Brackett (1901–1976).

References

Bibliography 

 Who's Who On The Stage – The Dramatic Reference Book and Biographical Dictionary of the Theatre, 1906 Edition, edited by Walter Browne & F.A. Austin, Walter Browne & F.A. Austin (publisher), New York (1906)
 Who's Who On The Stage – The Dramatic Reference Book and Biographical Dictionary of the Theatre, 1908 Edition, edited by Walter Browne & E. De Roy Koch, B.W. Dodge & Co., New York (1908)
 Who Was Who in America – A Component Volume of Who's Who in American History; Volume 1: 1897–1942, A.N. Marquis Co., Chicago (1943)
 Biography Index – A Cumulative Index to Biographical Material in Books and Magazines; Volume 5: September 1958 – August 1961, H.W. Wilson Company, New York (1962)
 Biography Index – A Cumulative Index to Biographical Material in Books and Magazines; Volume 6: September 1961 – August 1964, H.W. Wilson Company, New York (1965)
 The National Cyclopaedia of American Biography; Volume 31, James T. White & Co., New York (1944)
 Who Was Who in the Theatre: 1912–1976 – A biographical Dictionary of Actors, Actresses, Directors, Playwrights, and Producers of the English-Speaking Theatre, compiled from Who's Who in the Theatre, Volumes 1–15 (1912–1972), four volumes, Gale Research, Detroit (1978)

1872 births
1925 deaths
Broadway composers and lyricists
Songwriters from Maryland
History of New York City